Epipagis citrinalis is a moth in the family Crambidae. It is found on Dominica.

References

Moths described in 1899
Spilomelinae